This is a combined list of destinations operated to by Aer Lingus, its subsidiary Aer Lingus UK, and regional franchise Aer Lingus Regional . The airline currently operates scheduled and limited charter flights to/from a total of 93 airports, across 24 countries in Europe, North America, the Canary Islands, and a seasonal flight to the Asian portion of Turkey.

History 
On 23 March 2020, Stobart Air which operated under the Aer Lingus Regional brand announced it would suspend all international flights due to the COVID-19 pandemic. However its public service obligation (PSO) flights from Dublin Airport to Donegal Airport and Kerry Airport would continue.

On 29 March 2020, Aer Lingus began temporarily operating flights to Beijing Capital International Airport (IATA: PEK). This destination was organized in response to the COVID-19 pandemic, to collect personal protective equipment which was made in China for use in Ireland. The flights were not available for passenger bookings and did not carry flight attendants. By 7 April 2020, Aer Lingus confirmed on social media that Beijing had become their busiest route, with up to five flights daily, while other normally popular destinations saw a much reduced or totally suspended service. The destination, which is the airline's first in East Asia, is serviced by the company's Airbus A330 fleet. The airline announced it has completed its 100th flight to Beijing, carrying 1,300 tonnes of vital PPE.

On 24 March 2021, Aer Lingus announced the launch of four new routes from Manchester Airport; New York John F Kennedy and Orlando from 29 July 2021, Barbados from 20 October 2021 and Boston from summer 2022.

On 12 June 2021, Stobart Air, the operator of Aer Lingus Regional flights, entered liquidation, resulting in Aer Lingus Regional ceasing operations with immediate effect.

In October 2022, it was announced that Aer Lingus operations between Belfast City and London Heathrow would transfer to Aer Lingus UK due to Brexit related requirements that a European carrier could no longer fly domestic routes within the United Kingdom. These flights are operated by British Airways under Wet-Lease terms using the Aer Lingus UK flight numbers and callsigns. This currently does not affect the operations carried out by Emerald Airlines from Belfast City as an agreement is currently in place between the UK CAA, British Airways and themselves prior to Emerald Airlines securing a UK AOC.

Destinations

See also
 Aer Lingus UK destinations
 Aer Lingus Regional destinations

References

Aer Lingus
Destinations